Sleetmute (Deg Xinag: Tovisq'oł) is a census-designated place (CDP) in Bethel Census Area, Alaska, United States. At the 2010 census the population was 86, down from 100 in 2000.

Geography and Climate
Sleetmute  is located on the east bank of the Kuskokwim River, 1.5 miles north of its junction with the Holitna River. It lies 79 miles east of Aniak, 166 miles northeast of Bethel, and 243 miles west of Anchorage.

Demographics

Sleetmute first appeared on the 1930 U.S. Census as the unincorporated village of "Sleitmut." In 1940, it returned as "Sleitmute." In 1950, and in every successive census, it has returned as Sleetmute. In 1980, it was made a census-designated place (CDP).

As of the census of 2000, there were 100 people, 33 households, and 25 families residing in the CDP. The population density was 1.0 people per square mile (0.4/km2). There were 51 housing units at an average density of 0.5/sq mi (0.2/km2). The racial makeup of the CDP was 11.00% White and 89.00% Native American.

There were 33 households, out of which 33.3% had children under the age of 18 living with them, 45.5% were married couples living together, 21.2% had a female householder with no husband present, and 24.2% were non-families. 24.2% of all households were made up of individuals, and 9.1% had someone living alone who was 65 years of age or older. The average household size was 3.03 and the average family size was 3.56.

In the CDP, the population was spread out, with 33.0% under the age of 18, 8.0% from 18 to 24, 17.0% from 25 to 44, 29.0% from 45 to 64, and 13.0% who were 65 years of age or older. The median age was 37 years. For every 100 females, there were 138.1 males. For every 100 females age 18 and over, there were 109.4 males.

The median income for a household in the CDP was $15,000, and the median income for a family was $20,417. Males had a median income of $6,250 versus $0 for females. The per capita income for the CDP was $8,150. There were 47.4% of families and 57.7% of the population living below the poverty line, including 78.6% of under eighteens and 25.0% of those over 64.

References

Census-designated places in Alaska
Census-designated places in Bethel Census Area, Alaska
Census-designated places in Unorganized Borough, Alaska